Otter Falls (Southern Tutchone: Nadélin) is located on the Aishihik River in southwestern Yukon, a territory of Canada.

Accessible via the Aishihik Road (see Miscellaneous Yukon roads), the site of the falls has long been visited by lovers of the outdoors due to its picturesque nature, bird life (American dipper and harlequin duck amongst others) and sport fishing opportunities. An engraved scene of Otter Falls at mile 996 of the Alaska Highway, created by C. Gordon Yorke, is depicted on the $5 banknote of the 1954 Series of banknotes of the Canadian dollar.

Climate

Notes

References

Waterfalls of Yukon